North Harford Road is a neighborhood in northeast Baltimore, Maryland.

References

Neighborhoods in Baltimore
Northeast Baltimore